The Christ the King Church is a historic church building at Greenwood and South "S" Streets in Fort Smith, Arkansas. It is a Mission/Spanish revival style church built out of native fieldstone in 1930 to a design by Thompson, Sanders & Ginocchio.  It is an architecturally distinctive example of the work of Arkansas architect Charles L. Thompson, with transepts located near the front of the building (instead of the more traditional rear), and the angled parapet leading to the open belltower.  The building is now used by the parish as an academic facilities.

The building was listed on the National Register of Historic Places in 1982.

See also
National Register of Historic Places listings in Sebastian County, Arkansas

References

Churches on the National Register of Historic Places in Arkansas
Mission Revival architecture in Arkansas
Churches completed in 1930
Churches in Sebastian County, Arkansas
Buildings and structures in Fort Smith, Arkansas
National Register of Historic Places in Sebastian County, Arkansas
1930 establishments in Arkansas